Keith Quinn may refer to:

Keith Quinn (broadcaster) (born 1946), New Zealand sports commentator
Keith Quinn (footballer) (born 1988), Irish footballer

See also
Keith O'Quinn, American sports coach